Nola Margaret Bond is a former New Zealand sprinter. At the 1962 British Empire and Commonwealth Games she won the bronze medal in the women's 4 x 110 yards relay. Her teammates in the relay were Molly Cowan, Avis McIntosh and Doreen Porter. At the Games she also competed individually in the 100 and 200 metres.

References

Year of birth missing (living people)
Living people
New Zealand female sprinters
Commonwealth Games bronze medallists for New Zealand
Athletes (track and field) at the 1962 British Empire and Commonwealth Games
Commonwealth Games medallists in athletics
Medallists at the 1962 British Empire and Commonwealth Games